Katie Hill may refer to:

Katie Hill (basketball) (born 1984), Australian 3.0 point wheelchair basketball player
Katie Hill (politician) (born 1987), American politician from California
Katie Rain Hill (born 1994), American transgender activist and author

See also
Kate Hill, a mountain in Greene County, New York
Katy Hill (born 1971), English television presenter
Catherine Hill